Zhanggong is a town under the administration of Ningling County, Henan, China. , it has 27 villages under its administration.

References

Township-level divisions of Henan
Ningling County